Michigan is divided into 13 congressional districts, each represented by a member of the United States House of Representatives.

The districts are currently represented in the 118th United States Congress by 7 Democrats and 6 Republicans.

Due to considerable demographic and population change in Michigan over the years, an individual numbered district today does not necessarily cover the same geographic area as the same numbered district before reapportionment. For example, Pete Hoekstra and Bill Huizenga have represented the 2nd district since 1993, but are considered the "successors" of Guy Vander Jagt, since the current 2nd covers most of the territory represented by Vander Jagt in the 9th district before 1993.

Michigan lost a congressional seat after the 2022 midterm elections based on information from the 2020 United States census.

Current districts and representatives
List of members of the House delegation, time in office, district maps, and the district political ratings according to the CPVI. The delegation has 13 members, including 7 Democrats and 6 Republicans.

Historical district boundaries
Below is a table of United States congressional district boundary maps for the State of Michigan, presented chronologically forward. All redistricting events that took place in Michigan in the decades between 1973 and 2013 are shown.

Obsolete districts
Michigan's at-large congressional district
Michigan's 14th congressional district
Michigan's 15th congressional district
Michigan's 16th congressional district
Michigan's 17th congressional district
Michigan's 18th congressional district
Michigan's 19th congressional district

See also

United States congressional delegations from Michigan
List of United States congressional districts

Notes

References

External links
 
Michigan congressional districts Democrat chairs
Michigan congressional districts Republican chairs